The 2013 Elite League speedway season (also known as the Sky Sports Elite League for sponsorship reasons) was the 79th season of the top division of UK speedway and the took place between March and October 2013.

Summary
The Swindon Robins were the defending champions after winning in 2012.

Birmingham Brummies finished top of the regular season table but lost in the play off to Poole Pirates, who continued to enjoy British League success. It was their fifth success in ten years and was instrumented by their Australian duo Chris Holder and Darcy Ward and Poles Maciej Janowski and Przemysław Pawlicki.

League table

 Belle Vue were deducted 3 points after a Speedway Control Bureau hearing.

Home: 3W = Home win by 7 points or more; 2W = Home win by between 1 and 6 points 
Away: 4W = Away win by 7 points or more; 3W = Away win by between 1 and 6 points; 1L = Away loss by 6 points or less
M = Meetings; D = Draws; L = Losses; F = Race points for; A = Race points against; Pts = Total Points

Championship play-offs

Semi-finals
Leg 1

Leg 2

Grand final
First leg

Second leg

The Poole Pirates were declared Elite League Champions, winning on aggregate 104-79.

Knockout Cup
The Knockout Cup was not held during 2013.

Final leading averages

Riders & averages
Belle Vue

 9.12
 8.16
 5.95
 5.53
 5.39
 4.96
 4.85
 4.57

Birmingham

 8.24 
 8.00
 7.94
 7.29
 7.50
 5.77
 5.46

Coventry

 7.88
 7.85
 6.73
 4.41
 5.47
 5.45
 5.19
 3.11
 2.15

Eastbourne

 8.50
 7.32
 6.70
 6.23
 6.06
 5.68
 5.54
 4.41
 4.36

King's Lynn

 9.68
 7.64
 7.60
 7.08
 6.53
 6.19
 5.45
 5.19
 4.65
 4.00
 3.65

Lakeside

 8.52
 7.86
 7.01
 6.84
 6.70
 6.02
 5.74
 4.94
 4.17

Peterborough

 8.80
 8.78 
 7.82
 7.62
 6.80
 6.59
 6.41
 5.46
 4.87
 3.15

Poole

 9.73
 9.44 
 8.63
 7.44
 7.28
 6.06
 5.33
 4.56
 4.35
 3.86

Swindon

 9.24
 8.74
 8.32
 7.37
 7.15
 6.03
 5.22
 3.46

Wolverhampton

 9.93
 9.53
 8.76
 6.84
 5.83
 5.55
 5.29

See also
List of United Kingdom Speedway League Champions

References

SGB Premiership
Elite League
Speedway Elite